Salmo obtusirostris salonitana (also termed by the common names soft-muzzled trout or Solin salmon  and the scientific synonym Salmothymus obtusirostris salonitana) is an endemic trout subspecies found in the Jadro River in the vicinity of Solin (Dalmatia, Croatia), and in the nearby , where it was introduced in 1964.  The upper reaches of the Jadro River including Jadro Spring, covering an area of 7.8 hectares, have been protected as an ichthyological reserve since 1984, for the purpose of preserving this endangered fish species, S. o. salonitana.

This fish species is thought to be endangered not only by historic river diversions, but by increasing urbanisation, overfishing and by the presence of the rainbow trout, introduced into the Jadro before World War II.

References

Bibliography

 
 
 
 
 

obtusirostris salonitana
Freshwater fish of Europe
Fish of Europe
Endemic fauna of Croatia
Taxa named by Stanko Karaman